Tek Singh was a Sikh religious figure. Toba Tek Singh a Pakistani city from Punjab is named after him.

There is a legend associated with him that he was very kind-hearted man who served water and provided shelter to the worn out and thirsty travelers passing by a small pond ("toba" in Punjabi) which eventually was called Toba Tek Singh.

References

Punjabi people
People from Toba Tek Singh District